Edson José Rodríguez Quilarque (born 24 July 1970) is a Venezuelan football manager and former player who played as a defender. He is the current manager of Universidad Central.

During his playing career, Rodríguez notably represented Marítimo de Venezuela, winning four Venezuelan Primera División titles with the club. He also played for the Venezuela national team on 21 occasions, scoring once, and represented the nation in the 1993 and 1995 Copa América editions.

References

External links

1970 births
Living people
Footballers from Caracas
Venezuelan footballers
Association football defenders
Venezuelan Primera División players
Venezuelan Segunda División players
C.S. Marítimo de Venezuela players
Minervén S.C. players
Deportivo Miranda F.C. players
Atlético Venezuela C.F. players
Venezuela international footballers
Venezuelan football managers
Venezuelan Primera División managers
Atlético Venezuela C.F. managers
Universidad Central de Venezuela F.C. managers
Aragua F.C. managers
Estudiantes de Caracas S.C. managers
Deportivo Miranda F.C. managers